Kasai Rinkai Park (葛西臨海公園 Kasai Rinkai Kōen) is a park in Edogawa, Tokyo, Japan, it contains Diamond and flower ferris wheel, form the tallest ferris wheel in the world. which officially opened on 1 June 1989. The park includes a bird sanctuary and the Tokyo Sea Life Park aquarium. It was built on reclaimed land which includes two manmade islands, an observation deck and a hotel. It is the second-largest park in the 23 wards of Tokyo (after Mizumoto Park).

On a clear day, it affords views of Tokyo Bay, Chiba, Edogawa, Tokyo Disneyland, and Mount Fuji. It is reportedly the second tallest Ferris wheel in Japan.

About a third of the park is designated a sea bird sanctuary, which houses a Sea Bird Centre that provides information on the local bird species. The park also has two beaches on artificial islands. The west island is connected to land by the Kasai Nagisa bridge and is a popular place for recreation. The east island is closed to the public as a protected bird habitat and Ramsar site since 2018.

The park is always crowded during the 'hanami' period of spring, when the Japanese party under cherry trees in bloom.

Access
The park is served by Kasai-Rinkai Park Station of the East Japan Railway Company (JR East).

The park is passed through by water bus which is named as Tokyo Mizube Cruising Line and from/to Odaiba Seaside Park, Hama Rikyu and Asakusa Station (Tokyo Metro, Toei, Tobu).

References

External links

 Tokyo Metropolitan Park Association site 
 Japan Guidebook

Edogawa, Tokyo
Parks and gardens in Tokyo
Ramsar sites in Japan
1989 establishments in Japan